NGC 4477 is a barred lenticular galaxy located about 55 million light-years away in the constellation of Coma Berenices. NGC 4477 is classified as a type 2 Seyfert galaxy. The galaxy was discovered by astronomer William Herschel on April 8, 1784. NGC 4477 is a member of Markarian's Chain which forms part of the larger Virgo Cluster.

Physical characteristics 
NGC 4477 has a very well-defined bar which is imbedded within an extensive lens-like envelope. It has a fairly sharp edge and is slightly enhanced near the rim, and is classified as a ring-like feature. Surrounding the ring, two broad, diffuse incomplete arcs appear to bracket the galaxy around the bar. It is suggested that NGC 4477 has a highly evolved double ring morphology. Also, both ring features are exceedingly washed out.

See also 
 List of NGC objects (4001–5000)
 NGC 1291
 NGC 6782

Gallery

References

External links 

Barred lenticular galaxies
Seyfert galaxies
Coma Berenices
Virgo Cluster
4477
41260
7638
Astronomical objects discovered in 1784